Conference on Environment and Development may refer to:

 South African National Conference on Environment and Development, a three-day conference
 United Nations Conference on Environment and Development, a major United Nations conference